The Kourou Football Club (KFC) is a Guianan football club based in Kourou. The club competes in the Ligue de Guyane, the top tier of Guianan football. 

The club was founded in 2008, and play their home matches in the 4,000-capacity, Stade Bois Chaudat.

Honors 
French Guiana Promotion Division: 1
 2015–16

References

External links 
 FFF Club Profile
 Kourou FC Official Website

Football clubs in French Guiana